Personal bankruptcy (also known as personal insolvency) law allows, in certain jurisdictions, an individual to be declared bankrupt, which is a legal status of a person or other entity that cannot repay the debts it owes to creditors. In most jurisdictions, bankruptcy is imposed by a court order, often initiated by the debtor. Personal bankruptcy is distinguished from corporate bankruptcy, which generally does not directly affect the business owners' personal assets.

Modern bankruptcy law often distinguishes reorganization, in which only some of the bankrupt's assets are taken, a repayment plan is devised and part of the debt is discharged, from liquidation. In the latter type of bankruptcy, all of the debtors assets are included in the bankruptcy estate, sometimes in addition to his disposable income for a period of time, after which all of the debts are discharged.

The details vary between jurisdictions. In the US, the liquidation bankruptcy is governed by Chapter 7 of the Title 11 of the United States Code and is generally available to individuals passing a means test. Reorganization bankruptcy is governed by Chapters 11 and 13. Chapter 11 is mostly used by high net-worth individuals. In the 12-month period ending June 30, 2017, Chapter 7 and Chapter 11 bankruptcy filings accounted for, respectively, 474,258 (61%) and 1,099 (0.14%) out of 772,594 nonbusiness bankruptcy filings in the USA.

Notable bankrupts 
Bankruptcy filings by celebrities generate extensive publicity, which has been cited as a factor contributing to a shift towards a less negative public perception of personal bankruptcy observed since the 1960s. Lawyers have reported using celebrity examples to persuade their clients to file for bankruptcy.

Listed below are notable individuals who filed for personal bankruptcy or were subject to a similar form of insolvency management process. The list does not include business bankruptcies and bankruptcies that were not officially recognized.

Key

References 

Bankruptcy
Lists of people by legal status
Lists of bankruptcies